Supper at Emmaus or The Pilgrims at Emmaus is a c.1628 oil on panel painting by Rembrandt, now in the Musee Jacquemart-Andre in Paris

References

1628 paintings
Paintings in the collection of the Musée Jacquemart-André
Paintings by Rembrandt
Rembrandt